The Wallops Flight Facility Visitor Center is located in Building J-17, Wallops Island, Virginia, United States along Route 175. It contains exhibits highlighting past missions conducted at NASA's Wallops Flight Facility. The visitor center also provides information about current activities at Wallops Flight Facility, such as the sounding rocket, balloon and aircraft program. The outside grounds has a rocket garden consisting of rockets and aircraft used for space and aeronautical research, including a full-scale four-stage reentry vehicle used to study the Earth's atmosphere. In addition, the visitor center has educational programs on Earth and space science. It is also a viewing area for rocket launches.

History
The visitor center was established in 1982. It is named Robert L. Krieger Education Complex after the long term head of Wallops Flight Facility.

Exhibits
Some exhibits include:
Moon rock from Apollo 17
Scale models of rockets, satellites, research equipment and aircraft
Science On a Sphere
Hands-on interactive demonstrations and educational videos
Observation deck for watching launches from Wallops Flight Facility
Model rocket launches
Earth As Art

Image gallery

See also
List of NASA Visitor Centers

Notes

External links
NASA Visitor Center (official website)

Aerospace museums in Virginia
Museums in Accomack County, Virginia
NASA visitor centers
Science museums in Virginia
Museums established in 1982
1982 establishments in Virginia